Mason Geertsen (born April 19, 1995) is a Canadian professional ice hockey player for the Utica Comets of the American Hockey League (AHL) while under contract to the New Jersey Devils of the National Hockey League (NHL). He was selected in the fourth round, 93rd overall, by the Colorado Avalanche in the 2013 NHL Entry Draft.

Playing career
Geersten played bantam and midget hockey as a youth with the Leduc Oil Kings in the Alberta Major Bantam Hockey League and with the Sherwood Park Kings in the Alberta Midget Hockey League before joining major junior club, the Edmonton Oil Kings of the Western Hockey League (WHL), with whom he was drafted 18th overall in the first round of the 2010 WHL Bantam Draft.

In the following 2016–17 season, Geertsen was assigned to continue with the Rampage, on October 1, 2016. Used primarily in a defensive role adding physicality, Geertsen appeared in 36 games with the Rampage for 4 assists. He split the season again between the AHL and ECHL joining secondary affiliate, the Colorado Eagles in time for the postseason. Geersten remained with the club through the postseason, establishing a regular spot on the defence in recording 1 goal and 4 points in 19 games to help the Eagles capture their first Kelly Cup.

As an impending restricted free agent following the conclusion of his entry-level contract, Geertsen's tenure with the Avalanche ended after he was not tendered a qualifying offer on June 25, 2019. As a free agent over the summer, Geertsen was invited to attend the New York Rangers 2019 training camp. After a successful camp, Geertsen was among the Rangers second round of cuts and was signed to a one-year AHL contract with affiliate, the Hartford Wolf Pack, on September 29, 2019.

In the 2019–20 season, Geertsen established a role within the Wolf Pack's blueline as a physical stay-at-home defenceman, appearing in 60 regular season games and leading the club with 109 penalty minutes, before the season was cancelled due to the COVID-19 pandemic. On April 23, 2020, Geertsen was signed to remain within the Wolf Pack organization, agreeing to a one-year contract extension.

Entering the pandemic-delayed 2020–21 season, Geersten registered one assist through four games before he was signed to a two-year, two-way contract with the NHL affiliate, the New York Rangers, on March 4, 2021.

On October 3, 2021, Geertsen was claimed off waivers by the New Jersey Devils.

International play
Geertsen represented Canada Pacific at the 2012 World U-17 Hockey Challenge in Windsor, Ontario. He was scoreless in five games from the blueline in a fifth place finish.

Career statistics

Regular season and playoffs

International

Awards and honours

References

External links
 

1995 births
Living people
Canadian ice hockey defencemen
Colorado Avalanche draft picks
Colorado Eagles players
Edmonton Oil Kings players
Fort Wayne Komets players
Hartford Wolf Pack players
Ice hockey people from Alberta
Lake Erie Monsters players
New Jersey Devils players
San Antonio Rampage players
Utica Comets players
Vancouver Giants players